Shorea rubra is a tree in the family Dipterocarpaceae, native to Borneo. The specific epithet rubra means "red" and refers to the underside of the leaf.

Description
The dark brown to black bark is fissured and becomes flaky. The inflorescences bear yellow flowers.

Distribution and habitat
Shorea rubra is endemic to Borneo.

Conservation
Shorea rubra has been assessed as near threatened on the IUCN Red List. It is threatened by land conversion for agriculture. It is also threatened by logging for its timber. Shorea rubra does occur in a number of protected areas.

References

rubra
Endemic flora of Borneo
Plants described in 1962